Ailill mac Fáeláin was a King of Osraige in the south east of Gaelic Ireland. Ailill was of a dynasty known as the Dál Birn. Osraige was located in modern County Kilkenny, Ireland.

Ailill was a "Reges Ossairge", a King of Osraige, his year of accession is unknown, however, it was  after both the reign of  Cú Cherca mac Fáeláin, who had died in 712, and Fland mac Congaile who is without a date. The end of his reign is also unknown, however, by 728 Cellach mac Fáelchair had been recorded King.

Ailill is recorded in the Book of Leinster's king lists, and the synchronism's of Thurneysen, Boyle, as well as the Annals of Clonmacnoise. He is recorded as "Oillill" in the Annals of Clonmacnoise.

Ailill does not appear in the MS Rawlinson B 502 genealogies,  but it is presumed that this Ailill was the son of Fáelán mac Crundmaíl (died 660), and the brother of Cú Cherca mac Fáeláin (died 712), who were both King's of Osraige.

Lineage

The Dál Birn (Old Irish: "the assembly" or "portion" of "Birn") is a tribal epithet found in Irish sources which refers to the descendants of Loegaire Birn Buadach, the hereditary ruling lineage of the kingdom of Osraige in Ireland.

For a two-hundred year period beginning the late fifth century, the native Dál Birn kings were temporarily displaced by an allied Corcu Loígde dynasty which ruled Osraige until finally being overthrown.  A number of the Corcu Loígde kings are recorded as being periodically slain by the native inhabitants of Osraige until the re-establishment of the Dál Birn.

Dál Birn descendants remained in control of parts of Osraige, even after the Norman Invasion of Ireland, with the continuation of the Mac Giolla Phádraig lordship in Upper Ossory.  This senior Dál Birn lineage historically remained the most visible and in possession of an original portion of Osraige through the death of Bernard FitzPatrick, 2nd Baron Castletown in 1937.

References

Footnotes

Sources

Further reading

External links
 

Kings of Osraige
8th-century Irish monarchs
People from County Kilkenny
Year of birth unknown